Ceratophyllus zhovtyi is a species of flea in the family Aplin. It was described by Emel'yanova and Goncharov in 1966.

References 

Ceratophyllidae
Insects described in 1966